Andrea Pinton (born 28 April 1996) is an Italian professional footballer who plays as a centre-back for US Offanenghese 1933.

Pinton was signed by F.C. Internazionale Milano on 28 August 2012 in a 5-year contract for €220,000 fee (also costing Inter an additional €35,000).

In July 2015 Pinton was signed by Savona F.B.C.

On 1 February 2016 Pinton returned to Vicenza in a temporary deal.

On 24 November 2017, Pinton signed for Ciserano.

References

External links

Living people
1996 births
Association football defenders
Italian footballers
Inter Milan players
Torino F.C. players
Savona F.B.C. players
L.R. Vicenza players
U.S. Ciserano players
F.C. Lumezzane V.G.Z. A.S.D. players
Place of birth missing (living people)